Ernest Jackson (11 June 1914 – 1996) was an English footballer. He played as a right half.

Jackson joined Sheffield United from local amateur side Atlas & Norfolk Works in 1932. He started in the third team, but within two years, he made his debut in a First Division match against Wolverhampton Wanderers at Bramall Lane on 11 February 1933.

He did not win a regular place in the side until 1936, and, but for World War II, would have enjoyed twelve full season for the side. He resumed his playing career with Sheffield United after the war in 1946, and retired a few years later. In total he made 229 appearances for Sheffield United with 8 goals.

1914 births
1996 deaths
Footballers from Sheffield
English footballers
Forgemasters Sports & Social F.C. players
Association football wing halves
Sheffield Wednesday F.C. players
Grimsby Town F.C. players
Sheffield United F.C. players
English Football League players
FA Cup Final players